The 2012–13 Stanford Cardinal men's basketball team represented Stanford University during the 2012–13 NCAA Division I men's basketball season. The Cardinal, led by fifth year head coach Johnny Dawkins, played their home games at Maples Pavilion and were members of the Pac-12 Conference. They finished the season 19–15, 9–9 in Pac-12 play to finish in a four way tie for sixth place. They lost in the first round of the Pac-12 tournament to Arizona State. They were invited to the 2013 NIT where they defeated Stephen F. Austin in the first round before losing in the second round to Alabama.

Roster

Schedule
 
|-
!colspan=9| Exhibition

|-
!colspan=9| Regular season

|-
!colspan=9| 2013 Pac-12 tournament

|-
!colspan=9| 2013 NIT

References

Stanford
Stanford Cardinal men's basketball seasons
Stanford